Brian A. Kuhlman is an American professor of biochemistry and biophysics at the UNC School of Medicine of University of North Carolina at Chapel Hill and a Sloan Research Fellow.

Early life
Kuhlman obtained Bachelor of Arts degree in chemical physics from Rice University in 1992. From 1993 to 1998 he studied under guidance of Daniel Raleigh to earn his Ph.D. in chemistry from Stony Brook University and from 1999 to 2002 he studied under guidance from David Baker to obtain Damon Runyon Postdoctoral Fellowship at the University of Washington.

Career
In 2003, Kuhlman designed the first full-domain artificial protein, Top7, with Gautam Dantas and other researchers, in David Baker's laboratory. In his independent research laboratory, Kuhlman continued pioneering research in protein design, including breakthroughs in protein interface design, design of protein loops, stitching together components of natural proteins, designed fusions for bispecific antibodies, and progress toward vaccines.

Awards
DeLano Award for Computational Biosciences
Feynman Prize in Nanotechnology
Beckman Young Investigator

References

External links

Living people
American biochemists
American biophysicists
Rice University alumni
Stony Brook University alumni
University of Washington alumni
Sloan Research Fellows
University of North Carolina at Chapel Hill faculty
Year of birth missing (living people)